The 2016–17 Valencia CF season was the club's 97th season and its 82nd in La Liga. As in the previous season, the club finished 12th in La Liga. Valencia also competed in the Copa del Rey, entering at the Round of 32 and being eliminated by Celta Vigo 6–2 on aggregate in the Round of 16.

Squad

Out on loan

Transfers

In

Total spend: €30,000,000

Out

Competitions

Overall

Overview

La Liga

League table

Matches

Copa del Rey

Valencia joined the competition in the round of 32.

Round of 32

Round of 16

Statistics

Appearances and goals
Last updated on 21 May 2017

|-
! colspan=14 style=background:#dcdcdc; text-align:center|Goalkeepers

|-
! colspan=14 style=background:#dcdcdc; text-align:center|Defenders

|-
! colspan=14 style=background:#dcdcdc; text-align:center|Midfielders

|-
! colspan=14 style=background:#dcdcdc; text-align:center|Forwards

|-
! colspan=14 style=background:#dcdcdc; text-align:center| Players who have made an appearance or had a squad number this season but have been loaned out or transferred
|-

|-
|}

References

External links
Club's official website

Valencia
Valencia CF seasons